Ramagundam Police Commissionerate is a city police force with primary responsibilities in law enforcement and investigation within Peddapalli, Mancherial town, Ramagundam city and Godavarikhani urban areas.

Ramagundam Police Commissionerate covers entire Peddapalli and Mancherial districts.

Present Commissioner of police is Mrs Rema Rajeswari, IPS

References 

Telangana Police
2016 establishments in Telangana
Government agencies established in 2016
Peddapalli district
Mancherial district